Tai Nan is one of the 20 constituencies in the Yau Tsim Mong District. The constituency returns one district councillor to the Yau Tsim Mong District Council, with an election every four years.

Tai Nan constituency is loosely based on the area surrounding Tai Nan Street in western Mong Kok south of Boundary Street and North of Prince Edward Road West with estimated population of 20,432.

Councillors represented

Election results

2010s

2000s

1990s

References

Mong Kok
Constituencies of Hong Kong
Constituencies of Yau Tsim Mong District Council
1994 establishments in Hong Kong
Constituencies established in 1994